Hay Point is a coastal locality in Mackay Region, Queensland, Australia. It contains two towns, Hector on its north coast and Half Tide on its south coast.

Geography 

With a tidal range of 7.4m (the highest on the east coast of Australia), Hay Point has potential for electricity generation via tidal power.

History 
The town of Hector was first surveyed in 1902.

Coal export terminals 
Hay Point has two bulk coal terminals.  Dalrymple Bay Coal Terminal (DBCT) is owned by 
the Queensland State Government and leased for 50 years to Dalrymple Bay Infrastructure (formerly Babcock & Brown Infrastructure), who in turn engage Dalrymple Bay Coal Terminal Pty Ltd to operate, maintain and develop it. Hay Point Services Coal Terminal is owned and operated by BHP Mitsubishi Alliance a joint venture between BHP and Mitsubishi, and operated by Hay Point Services.

In 2003–4, 77 million tonnes of coal was exported through the two terminals. This makes Hay Point one of the largest coal ports in the world. 97 million tonnes was exported in 2021-22.

Education 
There are no schools in Hay Point. The nearest government primary school is Alligator Creek State School in neighbouring Alligator Creek to the south-west. The nearest government secondary school is Sarina State High School in Sarina to the south-west.

Amenities 
The Mackay Regional Council operates a mobile library service on a fortnightly schedule at the corner of Valroy and Carey Streets.

References

External links

 University of Queensland: Queensland Places: Hay Point
 Town map of Hector, 1979
 Town map of Half Tide, 1980
 Ports Corporation of Queensland
 Dalrymple Bay Coal Terminal
 Dalrymple Bay Coal Terminal Management

Coal terminals
Ports and harbours of Queensland
North Queensland
Mackay Region
Localities in Queensland